Voivodeship administrative court is the first instance administrative court in Poland. The headquarters of the court departments are located in the cities of Białystok, Bydgoszcz, Gdańsk, Gliwice, Gorzów Wielkopolski, Kielce, Kraków, Lublin, Łódź, Olsztyn, Opole, Poznań, Rzeszów, Szczecin, Warsaw (including a branch division located in Radom), and Wrocław.

Citations

References 

Judiciary of Poland